The 1915 Montana A&M football team was an American football team that represented the Montana College of Agriculture and Mechanic Arts (later renamed Montana State University) during the 1915 college football season. In its second season under head coach Fred Bennion, the team compiled a 4–2–1 record and was outscored by a total of 86 to 75.

Radford "Punk" Taylor, who had previously played for Gallatin High, was the team captain.

Cy Gatton was the quarterback and was selected at the end of the season to serve as captain of the 1916 team. In announcing the selection of Gatton, The Anaconda Standard noted: "Gatton has played a brilliant, scrappy and consistent game throughout the entire schedule and has been the pillar of the Aggie defense.

Schedule

References

Montana AandM
Montana State Bobcats football seasons
Montana AandM football